Kokutai-ji (List)  (Japanese: 国泰寺) Kokutai-ji can be:

Buddhist temple 
There are three temples named Kokutai-ji:
Kokutai-ji Temple in Akkeshi-cho, Hokkaido - a temple of Nanzen-ji branch of Rinzai Zen school. The temple was designated as a historic site. 
Kokutai-ji Temple in Ota, Takaoka City, Toyama – the head temple of Nanzenji branch of Rinzai Zen school. For more information, see Kokutai-ji. 
Kokutai-ji Temple in Hiroshima Nishi-ku, Hiroshima - a temple of Soto Zen school  

Place name derived from the temple
Kokutaiji Machi – a place name in Naka Ward, Hiroshima, Hiroshima Prefecture

Name of a high school
Hiroshima Prefectural Hiroshima Kokutai-ji High School in Kokutaiji-machi, Naka Ward, Hiroshima, Hiroshima Prefecture

References

External links
 国泰寺とバラサン岬（厚岸町公式Webサイト）
摩頂山 国泰寺
高岡市の文化財（高岡市教育委員会）

Buddhist temples in Japan